Eddie och Maxon Jaxon is a 1992 children's book by Viveca Sundvall. The book is the first in the Eddie series, a spinoff set in the same universe as the Mimmi series. Both Mimmi and Anders appear in the book.

The book won the 1992 Nils Holgersson Plaque in the category "Swedish children's and youth book of the year".

Plot
By August, Eddie will start school. He doesn't look forward to it. He would rather like to have a real job, like camel-keeper, because things aren't so free at school. His idols are Maradona, Madonna and "Maxon Jaxon". His father is single, and alcoholic.

References

1991 children's books
Rabén & Sjögren books
Works by Viveca Lärn
1991 Swedish novels